"Proof" is a song by the American singer-songwriter Paul Simon. It was the second single from his eighth studio album, The Rhythm of the Saints (1990), released on Warner Bros. Records.

Personnel

Paul Simon – lead and backing vocals
Martin Atangana – electric guitar
George Seba – electric guitar
Bakithi Kumalo – bass guitar
Andre Manga – bass guitar
Justin Tchounou – synthesizer
Jimmy McDonald – accordion
Steve Gadd – drums
Mingo Araujo – bass drum, cymbal, talking drum
Don Chacal – bongos
Sidinho Moreira – water bowl
Madeleine Yayodele Nelson – shekere
Alain Hatot – saxophone
Jacques Bolognesi – trombone
Phillipe Slominski – trumpet
Briz – backing vocals
Elolongue Mbango Catherine – background vocals
Djana'd – background vocals
Florence Gnimagnon – background vocals
Charlotte Mbango – backing vocals

Charts

Notes

References

Sources

 
 

1991 singles
Paul Simon songs
Songs written by Paul Simon
Song recordings produced by Paul Simon
Warner Records singles
1990 songs